Anita Endrezze (born 1952) is an American poet, writer, and artist based in Washington.

Background 
Endrezze was born in Long Beach, California, in 1952. She claims Yaqui ancestry from her father and European (Slovenian, German-Romanian, and northern Italian) ancestry from her mother.

She graduated with an master's degree from Eastern Washington University.

Career 
Endrezze is s a storyteller, artist and teacher. She teaches university courses and her work has been translated into seven languages, published in ten countries. She has taken part in the Washington State Council for the Humanities Speakers' Series.

Poet and artist 
In March 2000, Endrezze's book Throwing Fire at the Sun, Water at the Moon was published. The book is illustrated by her paintings.

A book of Endrezze's poems, at the helm of twilight, won the 1992 Bumbershoot/Weyerhaeuser Award and the Governor's Writing Award for Washington State. She also received a grant from Artist Trust to aid her in researching Throwing Fire at the Sun, Water at the Moon. Lune D'Ambre, a book of her poems translated into French, and published in France by the distinguished house, Rogerie, and a book, The Humming of Stars and Bees and Waves, published in England by Making Waves Press joins her international publications, along with a children's novel, The Mountain and the Guardian Spirit, (CDForlag) in Danish.

Personal 
Endrezze lives in Everett, Washington, is married with two children

Awards 
Endrezze's book At the Helm of Twilight was the winner of the Washington Governor's Writers Award and the 1992 Bumbershoot/Weyerhaeuser Publication Award.

Books by Anita Endrezze 
  Throwing Fire at the Sun, Water at the Moon, (Sun Tracks, V. 40), University of Arizona Press. Review at Voices in the Gaps. Publisher's page
 The Humming of Stars and Bees and Waves, Making Waves Press.
 at the helm of twilight, Broken Moon Press.A review of At the Helm of Twilight by Leslie Ulman from the Kenyon Review
 Burning the Fields, a Confluence Chapbook, Confluence Press, Lewis and Clark State College.
 The North People, The Blue Cloud Quarterly Press.

Textbooks 
 Approaching Literature in the 21st Century, Peter Schakel & Jack Ridl (Editors), Bedford/St. Martins Press.
 Three Genres: The Writing of Poetry, Fiction, and Drama, Stephen Minot, Prentice Hall.
 Approaching Poetry: Perspectives and Responses, Peter Schakel and Jack Ridl, St. Martin's Press.
 Western Wind: An Introduction to Poetry, by John Frederick Nims, McGraw Hill Text.
 Dreams and Inward Journeys: A Reader for Writers, Marjorie Ford, Jon Ford, Harpercollins College Div.
 Elements of Literature, by Robert Anderson, Holt Rinehart & Winston.
 Yo Words, One Reel, Seattle 1994
 " The Girl Who Loved the Sky "

Interviews 
 Here First, Arnold Krupat, Brian Swann (Editors), Random House

Work published in translation 
 Lune d'Ambre, (Rougerie, 1993) poems in French.
 Bjerget og Skystsaanden (The Mountain and the Guardian Spirit) (CDR Forlag, 1986)
 A children's book in Danish

References

External links

 Anita Endrezze from the Modern American Poetry site
 Anita telling the Yaqui Creation Story on Wisdom of the Elders
 Anita's entry in the Northwest Writers Index
 Anita's entry in the Snohomish County Author Index
 A small profile in PoetsWest
 A short biography from the Internet Public Library's Native American Authors Library
 Interview with Anita Endrezze – Poet, Scene Missing Magazine blog
This article uses content from https://web.archive.org/web/20100919065329/http://www.nativewiki.org/Anita_Endrezze, an article written by the NativeWiki user Kstrom who has licensed the text (see here) in a way that permits reuse under the Creative Commons Attribution-ShareAlike 3.0 Unported License. All relevant terms must be followed.

American poets of Italian descent
American people of German-Romanian descent
American people of Yaqui descent
Living people
American women painters
Painters from Washington (state)
American women poets
People from Everett, Washington
1952 births
21st-century American women artists